The Mark 32 torpedo was the first active acoustic antisubmarine homing torpedo in United States Navy service. The Mark 32 was withdrawn from service use with the introduction of the Mark 43 torpedo.

Ten were manufactured by Leeds & Northrup, Philadelphia during War II, and about 3,300 were manufactured by a combination of the Philco Corporation, Philadelphia, and the Naval Ordnance Plant, Forest Park, Illinois.

References

Torpedoes
Torpedoes of the United States
Unmanned underwater vehicles